Hanski is a surname. Notable people with the surname include:

Anna Hanski (born 1970), Finnish singer
Eino Hanski (1928–2000), Finnish writer, dramatist, and sculptor
Ilkka Hanski (1953–2016), Finnish ecologist
Vesa Hanski (born 1973), Finnish swimmer

Finnish-language surnames